Alessandro Sersanti (born 16 February 2002) is an Italian footballer who plays as midfielder for  club Juventus Next Gen.

Career 
Sersanti growed up in the Fiorentina Youth Sector, playing also for Siena. In 2019, he was loaned for two years to Grosseto. He scored three goals in 26 appearances in the 2019–20 season. In the following season, he scored two goals in 37 appearances.

Juventus U23 
On 30 July 2021, Sersanti moved to Juventus U23. On 22 August, Sersanti made his debut for Juventus U23 in a 3–2 win against Pro Sesto in a Coppa Italia Serie C match scoring also a goal in the 34th minute. On 6 March 2022, Sersanti was booked twice and therefore sent-off in a match eventually won 1–0 against Pro Sesto 2013.

Style of play 
He can play as mezz'ala and full back with a good technique. He has also been compared to Paul Pogba.

Career statistics

Club

External links

References

Notelist 

Living people
2002 births
ACF Fiorentina players
A.C.N. Siena 1904 players
U.S. Grosseto 1912 players
Italian footballers
Association football midfielders
Juventus Next Gen players
Juventus F.C. players
Serie C players
Serie D players